Terri Grodzicker is an American molecular geneticist and virologist who is currently the Dean of Academic Affairs at Cold Spring Harbor Laboratory. She also serves as the editor-in-chief of Genes & Development. Her research is in the field of human Adenoviridae. During her career at Cold Spring Harbor Laboratory she has edited more than a dozen books, and co-authored papers and books with other renown members of the laboratory such as Joseph Sambrook and Bruce Stillman.

Education 
Grodzicker received her B.A. in Zoology in 1963 from Wellesley College. She then completed a Master of Science and a PhD in Biology from Columbia University. During her time at Columbia she was a President's Fellow.

Research and career 
Immediately after her PhD, Grodzicker received an NIH postdoctoral fellowship and joined Harvard's department of microbiology and molecular genetics, where she worked with Jon Beckwith, focusing on the lactose operon E. coli.

References 

Living people
Wellesley College alumni
Columbia Graduate School of Arts and Sciences alumni
American women geneticists
American virologists
Year of birth missing (living people)
Women virologists